¿Y cómo es él? (Spanish for "And What Is He Like?") is a Mexican comedy film directed by Ariel Winograd. The film's title is inspired by the song of the same name performed by José Luis Perales, and a remake of the 2006 Korean film Driving with my Wife’s Lover. Its release was scheduled on 3 April 2020 in Mexico, but the premiere was postponed due to the COVID-19 pandemic. The film stars Zuria Vega, Mauricio Ochmann and Omar Chaparro. The film premiered on 22 April 2022.

Cast 
 Zuria Vega as Marcia
 Mauricio Ochmann as Tomás
 Omar Chaparro as Jero
 Miguel Rodarte as Juan Pablo
 Mauricio Barrientos as Lucas
 Consuelo Duval

References

External links 
 

2022 films
2022 romantic comedy films
Mexican romantic comedy films
Films postponed due to the COVID-19 pandemic
2020s Mexican films